Falsomordellina is a genus of beetles in the family Mordellidae, containing the following species:

 Falsomordellina amamiana (Nomura, 1961)
 Falsomordellina luteoloides (Nomura, 1961)
 Falsomordellina nigripennis Nomura, 1967
 Falsomordellina ohsumiana (Nakane, 1957)

References

Mordellidae